Toufic El Bacha (in Arabic توفيق الباشا) also written as Toufiq/Tawfiq el Basha/Al Basha (b. in Beirut, Lebanon 1924 - died Lebanon 2005) was a Lebanese composer and musician.

Life

Toufic El Bacha composed songs for Lebanese and Arab singers, and he composed music for traditional Arabic literary works, films and various orchestras. His works were released in a compilation of 17 CDs in 1998. He published three books:
Al Mukhtar min al Muwashahat al Andalusiyyah المختار من الموشحات الاندلسية 
Al Iiqaa' fil Musiiqa al Arabiyyah الايقاع في الموسيقى العربية
Al Kamaan wal Arbaa' as Sawtiyyah الكمان والارباع الصوتية

El Bacha was decorated many times by Lebanese, Arab and international authorities.

References

Lebanese composers
Lebanese songwriters
1924 births
2005 deaths
Musicians from Beirut